This is an incomplete list of Filipino full-length films, both mainstream and independently produced, released in theaters and cinemas in 2011.

Top ten grossing films

Note

  Box Office Mojo, a reliable third party box office revenue tracker, does not track any revenues earned during any Metro Manila Film Festival editions. So the official figures by film entries during the festival are only estimates taken from any recent updates from credible and reliable sources such as a film's production outfit, or from any news agencies. To verify the figures, see individual sources for the references.

Color key

Films

Awards ceremonies
These awards were given in 2012 for the films released in 2011.

See also
 2011 in the Philippines
 List of 2011 box office number-one films in the Philippines

References

Phil
2011 in the Philippines